Muhammad Khan Daha (born 1 August 1978) is a Pakistani politician who has been a member of the National Assembly of Pakistan, since August 2018. Previously, he was a member of the National Assembly from June 2013 to May 2018.

Early life
He was born on 1 August 1978 in a political family.

Political career

He ran for the seat of the National Assembly of Pakistan as a candidate of Pakistan Muslim League (N) (PML-N) from Constituency NA-157 (Khanewal-II) in 2008 Pakistani general election but was unsuccessful. He received 58,231 votes and lost the seat to Hamid Yar Hiraj.

He was elected to the National Assembly as a candidate of PML-N from Constituency NA-157 (Khanewal-II) in 2013 Pakistani general election. He received 96,162 votes and defeated Hamid Yar Hiraj.

He was re-elected to the National Assembly as a candidate of PML-N from Constituency NA-151 (Khanewal-II) in 2018 Pakistani general election.

References

Living people
Pakistan Muslim League (N) politicians
Punjabi people
Pakistani MNAs 2013–2018
1978 births
Pakistani MNAs 2018–2023